Sharron Dennis Washington (born January 29, 1943) was a Canadian football player who played for the Hamilton Tiger-Cats. He won the Grey Cup with them in 1967. He previously played college football at Northeast Missouri State University from 1963 to 1966. Washington was picked in the 1967 NFL draft by the Houston Oilers (#201 overall).

References

1940s births
Living people
Hamilton Tiger-Cats players
Players of American football from St. Louis
Players of Canadian football from St. Louis
American players of Canadian football
American football halfbacks
Canadian football running backs
Truman Bulldogs football players